Let Me Get By is the third studio album from blues-rock group Tedeschi Trucks Band, released in 2016.

Background
During breaks in touring in early 2015, the band used Trucks and Tedeschi's home studio in Jacksonville, FL to record the album. Unlike their previous album, Let Me Get By was written fully by the band, with help from Doyle Bramhall II. Trucks produced the album himself, after having co-produced the band's previous albums.

Reception

Thom Jurek of AllMusic wrote "An obvious studio offering, it's warm and resonant, yet crackling with energy and ideas. The feel is loose and grooving, the performances hot... Never has TTB sounded so organic, relaxed, and free. Let Me Get By is the album this group has been striving for since their formation. You need this."

Will Hermes of Rolling Stone wrote "Tedeschi has chops, charm, and a workmanlike style that could at times use some pizzazz. But sharing duties with polyvalent vocalist Mike Mattison... and the other soloists, she steers a band greater than its parts, and still growing better."

PopMatters wrote of the album "Past Tedeschi Trucks Band records had their charms and their high points but this is the record that gets everything right from the first note to the last and it’s a welcome progression from a band that deserves all the good things coming its way in the wake of this record."

Track listing

The deluxe CD release of Let Me Get By includes a bonus CD which includes:

 "Hear Me [Alternate Mix]" - 4:34
 "In Every Heart [Alternate Mix]" - 6:35
 "Oh! You Pretty Things" - 3:02
 "Just As Strange [Alternate Mix]" - 2:35
 "Satie Groove" - 4:04
 "Laugh About It [Live Recording - The Beacon Theatre, New York City, NY]" - 5:32
 "I Pity The Fool [Live Recording - The Beacon Theatre, New York City, NY]" - 6:51
 "Keep On Growing [Live Recording - The Beacon Theatre, New York City, NY]" - 9:38

Personnel
 Susan Tedeschi – lead vocals, rhythm guitar
 Derek Trucks – lead guitar
 Kofi Burbridge  – keyboards, flute
 Tyler Greenwell – drums, percussion
 J. J. Johnson – drums, percussion
 Mike Mattison – background vocals
 Mark Rivers – background vocals
 Alecia Chakour – background vocals
 Kebbi Williams – saxophone
 Tim Lefebvre - bass
 Maurice "Mobetta" Brown – trumpet
 Ephraim Owens – trumpet
 Elizabeth Lea – trombone

Charts

Weekly charts

Year-end charts

References

External links 
Tedeschi Trucks Band on New LP: 'It Never Felt Like We Were Under the Gun'

Tedeschi Trucks Band albums
2016 albums